The 2022–23 Georgia Tech Yellow Jackets men's basketball team represented the Georgia Institute of Technology during the 2022–23 NCAA Division I men's basketball season. They were led by seventh-year head coach Josh Pastner and played their home games at Hank McCamish Pavilion as members of the Atlantic Coast Conference.

Previous season
The Yellow Jackets finished the 2021–22 season 12–20, 5–15 in ACC play to finish in 14th place. In the ACC tournament, they lost to Louisville in the first round.

Offseason

Departures

Incoming transfers

Recruiting classes

2022 recruiting class

2023 recruiting class

Roster

Schedule and results

|-
!colspan=9 style=|Regular season

|-
!colspan=9 style=|ACC tournament

Source

References

Georgia Tech Yellow Jackets men's basketball seasons
Georgia Tech
2022 in sports in Georgia (U.S. state)
2023 in sports in Georgia (U.S. state)